Casiraghi is an Italian surname. Notable people with the surname include:

 Andrea Casiraghi (born 1984), 2nd in line to the Monegasque throne after his mother, Caroline, Princess of Hanover
 Charlotte Casiraghi (born 1986), 4th in line to the Monegasque throne after her mother, Caroline, Princess of Hanover
 Cinzia Casiraghi, an Italian physicist who won the Sofia Kovalevskaya Award
 Daniele Casiraghi, Italian footballer
 Sister Leonarda Angela Casiraghi, recipient of the Padma Shri Awards
 Pierluigi Casiraghi, (born 1969), Italian football player
 Pierre Casiraghi (born 1987), 3rd in line to the Monegasque throne after his mother, Caroline, Princess of Hanover
 Rosagnese Casiraghi, mayor of Missaglia
 Stefano Casiraghi (1960-1990), 2nd husband of Caroline, Princess of Hanover

Fictional characters:
 Signor Casiraghi, character in "Il mediatore"
 Camila Casiraghi, character in Juegos de fuego portrayed by Alejandra Fosalba

Italian-language surnames